Pieter Lammert "Piet" Bon (born 18 April 1946) is a retired Dutch rower. He competed at the 1968 Summer Olympics in the coxed eights event and finished in eighth place.

His father Simon was also an Olympic rower.

References

1946 births
Living people
Dutch male rowers
Olympic rowers of the Netherlands
Rowers at the 1968 Summer Olympics
People from Aalsmeer
Sportspeople from North Holland